Hinrich is both a masculine given name and a surname, a variant of Heinrich, the German form of Henry. People with the name include:
 
Given name:
Hinrich Braren (1751–1826), Danish sailor and writer
Hinrich Wilhelm Kopf (1893–1961), German politician
Hinrich Lohse (1896–1964), German Nazi politician, ruler of the Baltic States during World War II, one of the establishers of Riga Ghetto and main perpetrators of Rumbula massacre and Liepāja massacres
Hinrich Johannes Rink (1819–1893), Danish geologist, one of the pioneers of glaciology and the first accurate describer of the inland ice of Greenland
Hinrich Romeike (born 1963), German equestrian
Hinrich Schuldt (1901–1944), German Waffen-SS officer

Surname:
Kirk Hinrich (born 1981), American basketball player

See also
Hinrichs

Masculine given names